In project management, a death march is a project which participants believe to be destined for failure, or that requires a stretch of unsustainable overwork. The project marches to its death as its members are forced by their superiors to continue the project, against their better judgment. The term originated in the field of software development, and has since spread to other fields.

Death marches are usually a result of unrealistic or overly optimistic expectations in scheduling or feature scope, and often result from a lack of appropriate documentation, relevant training, or outside expertise needed to complete the project. Death marches can also be triggered by misunderstandings between parties, unresolved assumptions, mismatched expectations, and sometimes external change. Management may desperately attempt to right the course of the project by asking team members to work especially grueling hours (14-hour days or 7-day weeks) or by attempting to "throw (enough) bodies at the problem", often causing burnout.

The discomfort is heightened by project participants' knowledge that the failure is avoidable. It may have succeeded with competent management, such as by devoting the obviously required resources, including bringing all relevant expertise, technology, or applied science to the task, rather than just whatever incomplete knowledge a few employees happened to possess. Business culture pressures may play a role in addition to mere incompetence.

Among the most infamous death march projects are the Denver Airport baggage handling system and WARSIM, a U.S. Army wargame. The latter project was originally called WARSIM 2000 at its inception in the early 1990s. Several decades after its original scheduled delivery date, WARSIM had yet to support a single Army training exercise, but is still being funded, largely to vindicate those who conceived of the system and defended it over the lifetime of its development. WARSIM was eventually used in the North Carolina National Guard's Brigade Warfighter Exercise in January 2013. The WARSIM schedule slipped many times and still does not measure up to the legacy system it was supposed to replace. Moreover, WARSIM has a clumsy architecture that requires enough servers to fill a small room, while earlier "legacy" wargames run efficiently on a single standard desktop workstation.

The term "death march" in this context is discussed at length in Edward Yourdon's book Death March. Yourdon's definition: "Quite simply, a death march project is one whose 'project parameters' exceed the norm by at least 50 percent."

See also 
 Boondoggle
 Brooks's law
 Escalation of commitment
 Gold plating (software engineering)
 Optimism bias
 Planning fallacy
 Software Peter principle
 Shturmovshchina
 Wishful thinking

References

Software project management
Dysphemisms

de:Anti-Pattern#Death March